The Aeronautical Society may refer to:
Royal Aeronautical Society, known as the Aeronautical Society from 1866 to 1918
Aeronautical Society of India